Trichodes laminatus is a beetle species of checkered beetles belonging to the family Cleridae, subfamily Clerinae. It can be found in European part of Turkey, Greece, and Near East.

References

laminatus
Beetles of Europe
Beetles described in 1843